Ernest Barry Swallow (born 2 July 1942) is an English former professional footballer.

Career
Born in Arksey, Doncaster, West Riding of Yorkshire, Swallow started his career as a junior with Doncaster Rovers, turning professional in July 1959. He joined Crewe Alexandra in 1962 and played for them in their promotion season of 1962–63.

Swallow moved to Barnsley in July 1964 and then moved to Bradford City for £3,000 in February 1967, where he was in the side which gained promotion in the 1968–69 season.

Swallow signed for York City for £3,000 in October 1969. He helped the club to promotion in both the 1970–71 and 1973–74 seasons, and captained the club after they made it to the Second Division. He made a total of 312 appearances for the club.

He became a director of York City in 1981 and twice worked as caretaker manager.

References

1942 births
Living people
Footballers from Doncaster
English footballers
Association football defenders
Doncaster Rovers F.C. players
Crewe Alexandra F.C. players
Barnsley F.C. players
Bradford City A.F.C. players
York City F.C. players
English Football League players
English football managers
York City F.C. managers
English Football League managers
York City F.C. directors and chairmen